Tolchico, also known as Tolchaco or Tolchiko, is a populated place situated in Coconino County, Arizona, United States. Tolchico is derived from tolchiko, which is the Navajo term for the Colorado River. The name became official as a result of a Board on Geographic Names decision in April 1915.

In the 1880s Hermann Woolf kept a trading post here, termed Tolchico, Navajo for "river ford". Consequently, the ford here is referred to as Wolf Crossing.

References

External links
 Tolchico – ghosttowns.com

Ghost towns in Arizona
Populated places in Coconino County, Arizona